Kristian P. Wilsgård  (born 11 January 1983) is a Norwegian businessman and politician.

He hails from Torsken on the island of Senja, and resides in Tromsø.

He was elected deputy representative to the Storting for the period 2017–2021 for the Progress Party. He covered for cabinet member Per-Willy Amundsen at the Storting from October 2017.

References

1983 births
Living people
People from Torsken
Progress Party (Norway) politicians
Troms politicians
Members of the Storting
21st-century Norwegian politicians